Robert Theodore McCall (December 23, 1919 – February 26, 2010) was an American artist, known particularly for his works of space art.

Work
McCall was an illustrator for Life magazine in the 1960s, created promotional artwork for Stanley Kubrick's film 2001: A Space Odyssey and Richard Fleischer's production Tora! Tora! Tora! and worked as an artist for NASA, documenting the history of the Space Race.  McCall was also production illustrator on Star Trek: The Motion Picture.  The character Commander William Riker expressed admiration for the work of "Bob McCall" in one episode of the television series Star Trek: The Next Generation.

McCall's work can be found on U.S. postage stamps, and also NASA mission patches such as for Apollo 17. His murals grace the walls of the National Air and Space Museum, the National Gallery of Art, The Pentagon, Epcot, and Lyndon B. Johnson Space Center. McCall was also commissioned by The Walt Disney Company to do a painting called "The Prologue and The Promise" for the Epcot attraction, Horizons in 1983. Guests could see the mural at the end of the attraction as they exited.

McCall appeared as an imposter for a U.S. Air Force pilot on the June 24, 1963 episode of To Tell the Truth. He received one of the four possible votes from the panel.

McCall died in 2010 of heart failure in Scottsdale, Arizona.

Books 
Our World in Space, 1974, text by Isaac Asimov, illustrations by Robert McCall
The Art of Robert McCall: A Celebration of our Future in Space, Oct. 1992, introduction by Ray Bradbury
 Vision of the Future: The Art of Robert McCall, text by Ben Bova, illustrations by Robert McCall.

See also 
List of space artists
Similar artists
 Chesley Bonestell
 Joe Johnston
 Ralph McQuarrie

References

External links 

www.mccallstudios.com — McCall Studios, the art of Robert T. McCall
collectSPACE — News —  "Famed space artist Robert McCall, 90, dies"
Robert McCall Biography
AIAA Houston Section May 2011 Horizons newsletter, "Who's Who in the 1979 NASA/JSC McCall Mural" 
2001: A Space Odyssey
Robert T. McCall, Space Artist, Dies at 90

1919 births
2010 deaths
American illustrators
Artists from Arizona
People from Paradise Valley, Arizona
Science fiction artists
Columbus College of Art and Design alumni
Artists from Columbus, Ohio